Blacks Beach is a coastal suburb, one of the "northern beaches" of the city of Mackay in the Mackay Region, Queensland, Australia. In the  Blacks Beach had a population of 3,861 people.

Geography
Blacks Beach boasts a continuous  beach, the longest in the Mackay region. It is popular for watersports.

History 
The suburb is named after Maurice Hume Black, who operated The Cedars sugar plantation and mill from 1871. The mill closed in 1885 and the plantation then crushed their sugarcane at the River Estate sugar mill. Black had originally lived on the plantation but later moved to the coast.

In the 2011 census, the population was 2,871 people.

In the  Blacks Beach had a population of 3,861 people.

Education 
There are no schools in Blacks Beach. The nearest government primary schools are Eimeo Road State School in neighbouring Rural View to the west and Andergrove State School in neighbouring Andergrove to the south. The nearest secondary schools are Mackay Northern Beaches State High School in Rural View and Pioneer State High School in Andergrove.

Amenities 
The Mackay Regional Council operates a mobile library service on a fortnightly schedule at Blacks Beach Road.

There are a number of parks in the suburb, including:

 Blacks Beach Park
 Botha Street Park

 Carbeen Street Park

 Corella Way Park

 Emperor Drive Park

 Mclaughlin Drive Park

 Narrabeen Street

 Newport Parade Park

References

External links
 

Mackay Region
Suburbs of Mackay, Queensland